Warning of Danger is the second studio album by American heavy metal band Omen. It was originally released in 1985 by Metal Blade. In 1989, Metal Blade re-released the album with the EP Nightmares as bonus tracks.

Track listing

Personnel
Omen
 J.D. Kimball – vocals
 Kenny Powell – guitars
 Steve Wittig – drums
 Jody Henry – bass

Production
 Brian Slagel – production
 Eddy Schreyer – mastering
 Bill Metoyer – engineering

References

Omen (band) albums
1985 albums
Metal Blade Records albums